The 1967 Australian Touring Car Championship was a CAMS sanctioned national motor racing title open to Group C Improved Production Touring Cars. It was contested over a single race, staged at the Lakeside Circuit in Queensland, Australia on 30 July 1967. The title, which was the eighth Australian Touring Car Championship, was won by Ian Geoghegan, driving a Ford Mustang.

Report
Qualifying consisted of three preliminary heats, based on engine capacity, with the fastest lap times from the heats setting the grid for the race. Norm Beechey qualified his Chevrolet Chevy II Nova on pole position, while Ian Geoghegan qualified second in his new Ford Mustang, which had only arrived at the circuit on the morning of the race. Greg Cusack qualified third in another Mustang ahead of the Morris Cooper Ss of Brian Foley and Peter Manton.

Beechey took the lead at the start of the race ahead of Geoghegan, with Jim McKeown moving into third from sixth place on the grid. Bob Jane's Mustang became jammed in top gear on lap 2, forcing him to retire. Beechey set a new lap record of 1:04.3 as he continued to build his lead, despite a minor clutch problem which meant that he had to make clutchless shifts.

By lap 35, Terry Allan and Paul Fahey had both retired and Foley had moved into third place, with Manton running five seconds behind. The complexion of the race changed on lap 40, when the left-rear tyre of Beechey's car blew and caused him to hit the fence. Geoghegan inherited the lead and held it for the final ten laps to secure his third Australian Touring Car Championship title. Foley and Manton finished in second and third, less than twenty seconds behind Geoghegan.

Results

Class winners are indicated by bold text.

Statistics
 Pole position: Norm Beechey, 1:03.4
 Fastest lap: Norm Beechey, 1:03.3
 Race distance: 50 laps, 120.70 km
 Average speed: 132.34 km/h

References

External links
 Alec Mildren film on the 1967 Australian Touring Car Championship

Australian Touring Car Championship seasons
Touring Car Championship